The Philippine honey buzzard (Pernis steerei) is a species of bird of prey in the family Accipitridae.

It inhabits subtropical and tropical moist lowland and montane forest of the Philippines.

References

Philippine honey buzzard
Birds of the Philippines
Endemic birds of the Philippines
Philippine honey buzzard
Philippine honey buzzard